Domenico Carnovale was an Italian painter and architect, active mainly in his native Modena. He was known to be active c. the year 1564. He excelled in painting quadratura. He was also a reputable architect.

References

Architects from Modena
16th-century Italian architects
16th-century Italian painters
Italian male painters
Quadratura painters
Renaissance painters
Painters from Modena